Seigneur de Châtillon can refer to:

Gaspard I de Coligny (1465/1470 – 1522)
Gaspard II de Coligny (1519 – 1572) 
Gaspard III de Coligny (1584 – 1646)